
This is a list of the Sites of Special Scientific Interest (SSSIs) in Somerset, England, United Kingdom. In England the body responsible for designating SSSIs is Natural England, which chooses a site because of its fauna, flora, geological or physiographical features. There are 127 sites designated in this Area of Search, of which 83 have been designated due to their biological interest, 35 due to their geological interest, and 9 for both.

Natural England took over the role of designating and managing SSSIs from English Nature in October 2006 when it was formed from the amalgamation of English Nature, parts of the Countryside Agency and the Rural Development Service. Natural England, like its predecessor, uses the 1974–1996 county system, and as such the same approach is followed here, therefore some sites you may expect to find in this list could be in the Avon list. The data in the table is taken from English Nature in the form of citation sheets for each SSSI.

For other counties, see List of SSSIs by Area of Search.

Sites

Notes
Data rounded to one decimal place.
Grid reference is based on the British national grid reference system, also known as OSGB36, and is the system used by the Ordnance Survey.
Link to maps using the Nature on the Map service provided by English Nature.
Size smaller than can be shown with one decimal place. Actual size: 0.08 ha.
The Severn Estuary SSSI overlaps with the following SSSIs:
Avon: Spring Cove Cliffs, Middle Hope, Portishead Pier to Black Nore and Aust Cliff.
Gloucestershire: Purton Passage
South Glamorgan: Penarth Coast
Incorporates two former SSSIs: Severn Estuary (notified 1976) and part of Brean Down and Uphill Cliff (notified 1952). It was unified as Severn Estuary in 1989.
Size smaller than can be shown with one decimal place. Actual size: 0.04 ha. (0.1 ac.).
The Long Dole Wood and Meadows site extends into Bath and North East Somerset and so can be found on the list of SSSIs in Avon.

References

 
Somerset
Sites of Special Scientific Interest